Brigadier General Joseph F.H. Cutrona (born March 8, 1920, † December 25, 2010 in Naples, Florida)

Cutrona commanded the 4th Armored Division when it liberated - together with the 89th Infantry Division - the Ohrdruf concentration camp.
It was the first Nazi concentration camp liberated by the US Army (details and sources see Ohrdruf concentration camp#Liberation).

Cutrona also served in Korea and in Vietnam.

He was executive director of the National Shippers Strategic Transportation Council from 1978 to 1998.

Sources 

1920 births
2010 deaths
United States Army generals